"Peso" is a song by American rapper ASAP Rocky, produced by his ASAP Mob cohort, ASAP Ty Beats. The song, released as Rocky's debut single on ASAP Worldwide, Polo Grounds Music and RCA Records, is also the lead single from his critically acclaimed breakout mixtape Live. Love. ASAP (2011). The song contains a sample of The S.O.S. Band's
"No One's Gonna Love You", from their 1984 album Just the Way You Like It.

Music video
On December 13, 2011, the music video, directed by Abteen Bagheri, premiered on MTV2. After more than 17 million views on YouTube, A$AP Rocky was invited to tour as the opening act for Drake.

Charts

Certifications

References

2011 debut singles
ASAP Rocky songs
RCA Records singles
Songs about drugs
Songs written by ASAP Rocky
Cloud rap songs